The Roma Jazz Festival is a jazz event in the city of Rome, Italy. The Festival is organized by the International Music Festival Foundation (IMF).

History
In 1976, the Roma Jazz Festival was born amidst the ambiance of the “Roman Summer” demonstrations; however, after a few years, the festival took on its own identity in EUR area of Rome, performing on the main staircase of the Palazzo della Civiltà e del Lavoro. Subsequently, the event moved to the Tre Fontane area of Rome upon construction of the Euritmia performance venue. More recently, the festival transferred its location to the Foro Italico near the Roman Tennis Stadium.

In 1996, the festival renewed its identity transforming itself from a summer event to an autumn artistic celebration, bringing back music more suited to listening while also further elevating the musical and artistic talent.

The idea for the “Jazz Labels” project is due to the fortuitous recurrence, in 2009, of several historical anniversaries: 90 years from the first jazz album recorded in Italy, 70 years from the foundation of the American record company Blue Note, 50 years from the release of “Kind of Blue” by the Columbia, the best-selling album in jazz history (about 10 million copies) and, above all, regarded as the greatest jazz album of all time.

Themes
Over the years, through the selection of new artist and musicians, the festival has focused on and voiced two central themes: The Great Jazz Cultural Expression of the 900’s and Jazz as Ecumenical Music so that, by way of the common language of music, the festival has united humankind around the world.

Artists
The Roma Jazz Festival has presented its listeners more than 900 concerts during its 33 annual celebrations, with a total attendance of one million people.

Still today, the artist involved in this festival are among the most revered Italian and International interpreters of this music genre:
Miles Davis
Dizzy Gillespie
Sarah Vaughan
John McLaughlin
Gato Barbieri
Joe Henderson
The Manhattan Transfer
George Benson
Gerry Mulligan
Richard Galliano
John Scofield
Pat Metheny
Fats Domino
Woody Herman
Ray Charles
Betty Carter
B.B. King
Bob Dylan
Eloise January
Tania Maria
McCoy Tyner
Yellowjackets
Egberto Gismonti
Dee Dee Bridgewater
Chick Corea
Michael Becker
Jim Hall
Elvin Jones
David Murray
Pharoah Sanders
Michel Camilo
Norah Jones
Wayne Shorter
Diana Krall
Sonny Rollins

External links
Roma Jazz Festival
Roma Gospel Festival
Auditorium Parco della Musica
Sito Ufficiale dell'IMF

Jazz festivals in Italy
Festivals in Rome
Recurring events established in 1976